Ultra Bust-a-Move is a puzzle video game developed by Taito and published by Majesco Entertainment for Xbox in 2004.

Reception

Ultra Bust-a-Move and Bust-a-Move Deluxe received "average" reviews according to the review aggregation website Metacritic. In Japan, Famitsu gave both the Xbox and PSP versions each a score of 24 out of 40.

References

Notes

External links
 
 

2004 video games
505 Games games
Bubble Bobble
Majesco Entertainment games
Multiplayer and single-player video games
PlayStation Portable games
Puzzle video games
Taito games
Xbox games
Video games developed in Japan